Elmer Millard "Al" Gunderson (August 9, 1929 – May 13, 2010) was a justice of the Supreme Court of Nevada from 1971 to 1989.

Born in Minneapolis, Minnesota, Gunderson served in the United States Army during the Korean War, and received his law degree from Creighton University. He was a blackjack dealer in Las Vegas in his twenties.

In 1970, Gunderson ran for a seat on the Nevada Supreme Court. A 1970 editorial recommended his opponent, Harold O. Taber, noting that Gunderson had only been in practice for 12 years at that point, compared to Taber's 34 years, and that Gunderson was only ranked "fair" by fellow lawyers in the Martindale-Hubbell directory. However, Taber ran a poor campaign, while Gunderson "campaigned for months statewide and used the media heavily", resulting in Gunderson's victory.

He was elected to three terms on the Nevada Supreme Court, after which he taught law for two years at Southwestern Law School, from 1989 to 1991. After his retirement from the court, Gunderson was accused of running up state-paid phone bills with calls to casinos, construction companies, and state officials, but defended the charge with the claim that he was continuing to carry out state business from home following a heart attack.

Gunderson died in his home in 2010.

References

Justices of the Nevada Supreme Court
1929 births
2010 deaths
Lawyers from Minneapolis
Military personnel from Minnesota
Creighton University School of Law alumni
20th-century American judges
20th-century American lawyers
Chief Justices of the Nevada Supreme Court